Ignacio Fragoso Galindo (born February 6, 1968) is a retired male long-distance runner from Mexico.

Career

He set his personal best in the men's 5,000 metres event (13:59.48) on June 5, 1993 at a meet in Seville, Spain.

Achievements

References

sports-reference

1966 births
Living people
Mexican male long-distance runners
Athletes (track and field) at the 1991 Pan American Games
Athletes (track and field) at the 1992 Summer Olympics
Olympic athletes of Mexico
Pan American Games medalists in athletics (track and field)
Pan American Games silver medalists for Mexico
Medalists at the 1991 Pan American Games
20th-century Mexican people